National Route 145 is a national highway of Japan connecting Naganohara, Gunma and Numata, Gunma in Japan, with a total length of 49.8 km (30.94 mi).

References

145
Roads in Gunma Prefecture